Mederos is a Spanish-language surname. Notable people with the surname include:

Enrique Mederos (1967–2004), Mexican voice actor
Manuel de Mederos (1539 – c. 1613), Portuguese explorer
Rene Mederos (1933–1996), Cuban artist
Rodolfo Mederos (born 1940), Argentine musician
Rogel Lazaro Aguilera-Mederos, a truck driver responsible for the 2019 Lakewood semi-truck crash

See also
Medeiros (disambiguation), the Portuguese-language variant
Medero

Spanish-language surnames